WKVR may refer to:

 WKVR (FM), a radio station (88.9 FM) licensed to serve Flint, Michigan, United States
 WKVR-FM, a defunct radio station (92.3 FM) formerly licensed to serve Huntingdon, Pennsylvania, United States